James Edward Duval is an American actor. He is known for his roles in the Gregg Araki Teenage Apocalypse film trilogy—Totally F***ed Up, The Doom Generation, and Nowhere. His other notable roles include Miguel in Independence Day (1996), Singh in Go (1999), Frank in Donnie Darko (2001), and Blank in May (2002).

Duval has starred in numerous independent films, including the 2009 psychological thriller The Black Waters of Echo's Pond and the mystery crime-thriller film Noirland directed by Ramzi Abed.

Filmography

References

External links
Youthquake Magazine Article Cathy L. Witbrodt

James Duval Fan Site
Closing Time Starring James Duval

1972 births
Living people
American male film actors
Male actors from Michigan
20th-century American male actors
21st-century American male actors